Patacharkuchi Assembly constituency is one of the 126 assembly constituencies of Assam Legislative Assembly in India. Patacharkuchi forms part of the Barpeta Lok Sabha constituency.

Members of Legislative Assembly 
 1951: Homeshwar Deb Choudhury, Socialist Party and Baikunthanath Das, Indian National Congress
 1957: Birendra Kumar Das, Praja Socialist Party and Surendra Nath Das, Indian National Congress
 1962: Homeshwar Deb Choudhury, Praja Socialist Party
 1967: Bhubaneswar Barman, Praja Socialist Party
 1972: Krishna Kanta Lahkar, Indian National Congress
 1978: Bhubaneswar Barman, Janata Party
 1983: Rabi Ram Das, Indian National Congress
 1985: Pabin Chandra Deka, Independent
 1991: Krishna Kanta Lahkar, Independent
 1996: Mohan Das, Asom Gana Parishad
 2001: Pabindra Deka, Independent
 2006: Dr. Malaya Borman, Indian National Congress
 2011: Manoranjan Das, Bharatiya Janata Party
 2016: Pabindra Deka, Asom Gana Parishad
 2021: Ranjeet Kumar Dass, Bharatiya Janata Party

Election results

2016 Result

2011 result

References

External links 
 

Assembly constituencies of Assam